Birdwood is an unincorporated community in Lincoln County, Nebraska, United States.

History
A post office was established at Birdwood in 1888, and remained in operation until it was discontinued in 1896. The community was named from the Birdwood Creek nearby.

References

Unincorporated communities in Lincoln County, Nebraska
Unincorporated communities in Nebraska